The 62nd Mobil 1 12 Hours of Sebring fueled by Fresh from Florida was an endurance sports car racing event held at Sebring International Raceway near Sebring, Florida from 13–15 March 2014.  The race was the second round of the inaugural Tudor United SportsCar Championship, replacing the former American Le Mans Series that previously held the 12 Hours since 1999, as well as the second round of the North American Endurance Cup.  Daytona Prototypes were introduced to the race for the first time as part of the development of the United SportsCar Championship.

The race was won by Chip Ganassi Racing's Riley-Ford driven by Scott Pruett, Memo Rojas, and Marino Franchitti, ahead of Extreme Speed Motorsports' HPD-Honda and Action Express Racing's Chevrolet Corvette.  Ford's victory was the company's first since 1969.  The PC class winners were CORE Autosport in their second straight victory of the season, with drivers Colin Braun, Jon Bennett, and James Gue.  Porsche North America also earned their second win of the year in GTLM with Patrick Long, Michael Christensen, and Jörg Bergmeister.  The GTD category was led by Magnus Racing's Andy Lally, John Potter, and Marco Seefried.

Race

Race result

References

12 Hours of Sebring
Sebring
Sebring
12 Hours of Sebring